Omar Goodness is an American pop rock band, formed in Warsaw, Indiana in 1997.

History 

The band took its name from a children's knock-knock joke book.

Omar Goodness was formed by Chris Gackenheimer, Taylor Bean, and Owen Compton. Gackenheimer and Compton played little league baseball together as children. The two met Bean in an algebra course at Warsaw Community High School. Practices began at a local church and the band made its first public appearance months later at the high school talent show. The band played many local concerts with several different drummers from 1998 to 1999. In 1999, the three core members graduated high school and the band went on hiatus. While the band played relatively few public shows during this time, two albums were recorded during this hiatus.

Despite their dormancy, Omar Goodness has had a surge of popularity due to songs uploaded onto audiogalaxy and mp3.com. The band was a featured artist on audiogalaxy with the likes of Sigur Rós and Spacehog. This exposure led to radio play across the United States.

The band has become a mainstay on international radio since 2001 when their song Canadian Girls began playing on Marketplace, a program featured on Public Radio International. Their low profile, however, has led to their songs being attributed to similar bands such as Beulah and Barenaked Ladies.

While the band has not played any official concerts since going on hiatus, there have been several ad hoc shows when the core members are together.

Discography 
 Omar Goodness (1998)
 Not John Wayne (1999)
 F is for Four Eyes (2000)

Core Members 
 Chris Gackenheimer (lead vocals, lead guitar)
 Owen Compton (rhythm guitar, vocals)
 Taylor Bean (bass, vocals)

References

External links
 Official Site
 Feature on Audiogalaxy

American pop rock music groups
Musical groups established in 1997
Rock music groups from Indiana